Phulpur may refer to:

Bangladesh
Phulpur Upazila, upazila in Mymensingh  district, Bangladesh
Phulpur, Mymensingh, town in Mymensingh Division, Bangladesh

India
Phulpur, Agra, village in Agra district of Uttar Pradesh, India
Phulpur, Allahabad, town in Allahabad district of Uttar Pradesh, India
Phulpur, Azamgarh, town in Azamgarh district of Uttar Pradesh, India